The 2022 MEAC men's basketball tournament was the postseason men's basketball tournament for the 2021–22 season in the Mid-Eastern Athletic Conference (MEAC). The tournament took place during March 9–12, 2022. The tournament winner, Norfolk State, received the conference's automatic invitation to the 2022 NCAA Division I men's basketball tournament.

Seeds 
8 eligible teams were seeded by record within the conference, with a tiebreaker system to seed teams with identical conference records.

Schedule

Bracket

References 

Tournament
MEAC men's basketball tournament
Basketball competitions in Norfolk, Virginia
College basketball tournaments in Virginia
MEAC men's basketball tournament
MEAC men's basketball tournament